Parāoa rēwena (literally, "flour leaven") is a type of sourdough bread from New Zealand. The bread is leavened with a fermented potato starter that is commonly known as a bug. It originated amongst the Māori people and is closely associated with Māori cuisine. The bread is also known as Rēwena bread or Māori bread.

Etymology 
Both 'parāoa' and 'rēwena' are transliterations of English words introduced to New Zealand. Parāoa is the direct transliteration of the word 'flour' which also functioned to refer to bread or dough. Rēwena is the direct transliteration of the word 'leaven' referring to the biological leavening ingredient used as a raising agent. Another example of bread developed by the Māori people of New Zealand is parāoa parai (literally "flour fried").

Preparation 
Rēwena bread uses a pre-ferment starter, also called a ‘bug.’ 
It is created by boiling and mashing potatoes, then adding flour and sugar. Māori potatoes (taewa) are commonly used for this purpose.
Kūmara, or sweet potatoes, may also be used. 
The mixture is then allowed to ferment from one to several days, depending on the ambient temperature and humidity. 
As with most sourdough breads, the starter can be maintained and used indefinitely, as long as the yeast is kept alive with regular feeding. The potato starter and fermentation lends rēwena bread its characteristic sweet and sour taste. The starter is then mixed with flour and water, kneaded, and baked, usually in a round loaf.

Cultural significance 
Rēwena may also be used to break the Māori taboo associated with visiting a cemetery by crumbling the bread over hands in lieu of washing with water.

References 

Māori cuisine
New Zealand breads
Sourdough breads
Potato dishes